Rosette Sharma, also known by her stage names Rosette, Rosette Luve, Rozette, and Rosetta, is a Canadian singer, songwriter, and actress.

Early life
Sharma was born in British Columbia. She is of Fijian, Caucasian, Egyptian, Indian descent. She graduated from Riverside Secondary School in Port Coquitlam in 2000.

Career
In 2004, she placed seventh in the Canadian edition of Popstars. In 2005, Rosette released her first album Uh Oh on Shred Records. Its lead single "Crushed" topped the CanCon Top 40 chart for four weeks. Rosette's most successful single to-date has been "Amnesia" which was released in 2012. It became a top 40 hit in Canada and the Netherlands and was certified Gold in Canada. In 2013, Sharma co-wrote "Til It's Gone" on Britney Spears' album Britney Jean.
In 2012, she was signed to Ultra Records.

Discography

Albums
 Uh Oh (2005)

Singles

As lead artist
 2005: "Crushed"
 2006: "Uh-Oh"
 2009: "Ditzy Girl"
 2013: "I Wanna Fly" (featuring Kardinal Offishall)
 2015: "Sweetest Mistake"
 2015: "Rain"

As featured artist

Other appearances
 2011: "We've Only Just Begun" (Dimaro featuring Rosette and Carlprit)
 2012: "Bits 'N Pieces" (Dim Chris featuring Craig David and Rosette)
 2013: "Partied All the Night" (Mischa Daniels featuring Rosette and Craig Smart)
 2015: "No Place Like Home" (Blasterjaxx featuring Rosette)

Filmography

References

External links
 
 

1982 births
21st-century Canadian women singers
Canadian women singer-songwriters
Living people
Musicians from British Columbia
People from New Westminster
Canadian women pop singers